Loorenkopf tower is a  high freestanding wood lattice tower on Adlisberg, north of Witikon in Zürich, Switzerland. It was built in 1954. The tower is owned by Zürich city and it is open to the public.

The upper platform is reached by 153 steps. On a clear day with high visibility, you can see Eiger, Mönch and Jungfrau.

External links

Towers in Switzerland
Buildings and structures in the canton of Zürich
Tourist attractions in the canton of Zürich